Dancing on Glass is a 2022 Spanish drama film directed by Jota Linares which stars María Pedraza and Paula Losada.

Plot 
The plot follows the friendship developed between two ballerinas dancing for a ballet company.

Cast

Production 
The screenplay was penned by  alongside Jorge Naranjo. Produced by Federation Spain (a newly-born Spanish subsidiary of Federation Entertainment), the film began shooting in Madrid on 8 February 2021. Shooting wrapped by April 2021.

Release 
The film was presented on 25 March 2022 at the main competition of the 25th Málaga Festival. It debuted on Netflix streaming on 8 April 2022.

Reception 
Javier Ocaña of El País assessed that Dancing on Glass, featuring a "commendable physical and artistic work by Pedraza, and a formidable solidity in Martínez and Baglivi", is a "more than appreciable third film by a director still in his beginnings who, perhaps, has been overwhelmed by ambition in an excessively bizarre denouement".

Accolades 

|-
| align = "center" | 2023 || 37th Goya Awards || Best Original Score || Iván Palomares ||  || 
|}

See also 
 List of Spanish films of 2022

References

External links 
 Dancing on Glass on ICAA's Catálogo de Cinespañol

2022 films
Spanish drama films
Films about ballet
Films shot in Madrid
2022 drama films
Spanish-language Netflix original films
2020s Spanish-language films
2020s Spanish films